Miguel Manzano (14 September 1907 in Guadalajara, Jalisco, Mexico – 21 January 1992 in Mexico City) was a Mexican actor during the Golden Age of Mexican cinema, winning an Ariel Award in 1985, for best supporting actor for the film Las glorias del gran Púas, where he played the role of Rubén Olivares' boxing trainer.

In 1986, he appeared in the famous Mexican telenovela, Tu o Nadie, playing Lucia Mendez's character's father.

Selected filmography

 The Private Life of Mark Antony and Cleopatra (1947)
 The Genius (1948)
 The Magician (1949)
 Confessions of a Taxi Driver (1949)
 The Two Orphans (1950)
 Over the Waves (1950)
 Lost (1950)
 My General's Women (1951)
 Engagement Ring (1951)
 Kill Me Because I'm Dying! (1951)
 They Say I'm a Communist (1951)
 The Atomic Fireman (1952)
 The Price of Living (1954)
 Drop the Curtain (1955)
 A Few Drinks (1958)
 The Miracle Roses (1960)
 Love in the Shadows (1960)
 Lola the Truck Driver (1983)

References
Various (2000). Época de oro del cine mexicano de la A a la Z. En SOMOS. México: Editorial Televisa, S. A. de C.V.

External links 
 
 Archived page on the Academia Mexicana de Artes y Ciencias Cinematográficas 

20th-century Mexican male actors
Golden Age of Mexican cinema
1907 births
1992 deaths
Male actors from Guadalajara, Jalisco
Best supporting male actors Ariel Award winners
Mexican male film actors